The 13th Pan American Games were held in Winnipeg, Manitoba, Canada from July 23 to August 8, 1999.

Results by event

See also
Guyana at the 2000 Summer Olympics

References

Nations at the 1999 Pan American Games
Pan American Games
1999